A Sportsman's Wife is a 1921 British silent sports film directed by Walter West and starring Violet Hopson, Gregory Scott and Clive Brook.

Cast
 Violet Hopson - Jessica Dunders 
 Gregory Scott - Harry Kerr 
 Clive Brook - Dick Anderson 
 Mercy Hatton - Kitty Vickers 
 Arthur Walcott - The Agent 
 Adeline Hayden Coffin - Mrs. Dundas

References

External links

1921 films
British silent feature films
British sports drama films
1920s sports drama films
Broadwest films
Films directed by Walter West
British black-and-white films
1921 drama films
1920s English-language films
1920s British films
Silent sports drama films